This is a list of archives in the United Kingdom.  there were 122 national, 654 local, 328 university, 1,224 special and 61 business archives.

UK-wide archives 

 UK Data Archive, Colchester
 UK Government Web Archive
 UK Web Archive

Archives in England 

 Archaeology Data Service, York
 Barking and Dagenham Archives and Local Studies, Dagenham
 Barnsley Archives and Local Studies
 Bath Record Office
 Battersea Dogs & Cats Home Archive, London
 BBC Archives
 BBC Sound Archive
 Bedfordshire and Luton Archives and Records Service, Bedford
 Berkshire Record Office, Reading
 Bexley Local Studies and Archive Centre, London
 Birmingham City Archives
 Bishopsgate Institute, London
 Black Cultural Archives, Brixton
 Borthwick Institute for Archives, York
 BFI National Archive, Berkhamsted, Hertfordshire and Gaydon, Warwickshire
 BP Archive, near Coventry (shares premises with the Modern Records Centre)
 Bristol Archives
 Bromley Historic Collections, Kent
 BT Archives, London
 Cambridgeshire Archives and Local Studies, Cambridge and Huntingdon
 Camden Local Studies and Archives Centre, London
 Canterbury Cathedral Archives
 Centre for Buckinghamshire Studies, Aylesbury
 Cheshire Record Office, Chester
 City of Westminster Archives Centre
 Cornwall Record Office, Truro
 Coventry Archives
 Cumbria Archive Service, Barrow, Carlisle, Kendal and Whitehaven
 Derbyshire Record Office, Matlock
 Devon Record Office, Exeter
 Doncaster Archives
 Dorset History Centre, Dorchester
Downside Abbey Archives, Somerset (includes archives of the English Benedictine Congregation)
 Dudley Archives and Local History
 Durham County Record Office
 East London Theatre Archive
 East Riding of Yorkshire Archive Service
 East Sussex Record Office, Lewes
EMI Archive Trust, Hayes
 Endangered Languages Archive (ELAR), London  
 English Heritage Archive, Swindon
 Essex Record Office, Chelmsford, Colchester, Harlow, Saffron Walden and Southend
 Family Records Centre, London
 George Padmore Institute, London
 Gloucestershire Archives, Gloucester
 Greater Manchester County Record Office
 Hackney Archives
 Hampshire Record Office
 Harrow School Archives, Harrow
 Herefordshire Record Office
 Hertfordshire Archives and Local Studies
 Hull City Archives
 Hull History Centre: Hull City Archives, Hull University Archives and Local Studies Library
 Hyman Archive, London
 Imperial College Healthcare NHS Trust Archives
 India Office Records at The British Library
 Islington Local History Centre, London
 Kent History and Library Centre, Maidstone
 Kingston History Centre, Kingston upon Thames
 Lambeth Archives
 Lambeth Palace Library
 Lebrecht Photo Library, St John's Wood, London
 Lichfield Record Office
 Lincolnshire Archives, Lincoln
 Liverpool Record Office
 London Metropolitan Archives
 Manchester Archives and Local Studies
Manchester Digital Music Archive
 Media Archive for Central England 
 Medway Archives, Strood
 Mills Archive, Reading
 Modern Records Centre, near Coventry
 The National Archives [of the United Kingdom], Kew
 National Co-operative Archive, Manchester
 National Jazz Archive, Loughton, Essex
 National Gas Archive, Warrington
 National Theatre Archive, London
 Newham Archives and Local Studies Library
 Norfolk Record Office, Norwich
 North Highland Archive, Wick
 North Yorkshire County Record Office, Northallerton
 Northamptonshire Record Office, Northampton
 Northumberland Record Office, Berwick-upon-Tweed and Woodhorn 
 Nottinghamshire Archives, Nottingham
 Nottingham University, Manuscripts and Special Collections
 Oldham Local Studies and Archives
 Oxfordshire Record Office, Cowley near Oxford
 Parliamentary Archives, London (formerly the House of Lords Record Office)
 Plymouth and West Devon Record Office
 Record Office for Leicestershire, Leicester and Rutland, near Leicester
 Redbridge Heritage Centre, Ilford
 Rotherham Archives and Local Studies Service
 Royal Archives, Windsor
 Royal College of Nursing Archives, Edinburgh
 Royal College of Physicians Archives, London
 Royal Mail Archive, London
 Sainsbury Archive, London
 Sandwell Community History and Archives Service
 Savoy Archives, London
 Shropshire Archives, Shrewsbury
 Shakespeare Birthplace Trust Record Office, Stratford-upon-Avon
 Sheffield Archives
 Somerset Archives and Local Studies
 Sorabji Archive, Hereford
 Southampton Archives
 Staffordshire Record Office, Stafford
 Stoke on Trent City Archives
 Suffolk Record Office, Bury St Edmunds, Ipswich and Lowestoft
 Surrey History Centre, Woking
 Teesside Archives, Middlesbrough
 Tower Hamlets Local History Library and Archives, London
 Transport for London Corporate Archives, London
 Tyne and Wear Archives Service, Newcastle-upon-Tyne
 Walsall Local History Centre
 Waltham Forest Archives and Local Studies Library
 Warwickshire County Records Office, Warwick
 Waterways Archive, Gloucester
 West Sussex Record Office, Chichester
 West Yorkshire Archive Service, Bradford, Halifax, Huddersfield, Leeds and Wakefield
 Wiltshire and Swindon Record Office, Chippenham
 Wolverhampton Archives and Local Studies
 Worcestershire Record Office
 York City Archive

Archives in Northern Ireland 

 Public Record Office of Northern Ireland

Archives in Scotland 

 Angus Archives
 Archives of the University of Glasgow
 Ayrshire Archives
 Clackmannanshire Archives
 Dundee City Archives 
 Archive Services, University of Dundee 
 East Dunbartonshire Archives
 Glasgow University Archive Services, Glasgow
 Highland Council Archive, Inverness
 National Archives of Scotland

Archives in Wales 

 A.N. Palmer Centre for Local Studies and Archives, Wrexham
 Anglesey County Record Office, Llangefni
 Caernarfon Record Office
 Carmarthenshire Archives Service
 Ceredigion Archives, Aberystwyth
 Conwy Archive Service, Llandudno
 Flintshire Record Office, Hawarden
 Denbighshire Record Office, Ruthin
 Glamorgan Archives, Cardiff
 Gwent Archives, Ebbw Vale 
 Meirionnydd Record Office, Dolgellau
 National Library of Wales, Aberystwyth
 Pembrokeshire Record Office
 Powys County Archives Office, Llandrindod Wells
 Roderic Bowen Library and Archive, Lampeter
 West Glamorgan Archive Service, Swansea

See also 
 List of archives
County record office and :Category:County record offices in England
 List of museums in the United Kingdom
 Culture of the United Kingdom

References

External links 

 
Archives
United Kingdom
Archives